Daniel Stern may refer to:
Daniel Stern (actor) (born 1957), American actor
The pen name of Marie d'Agoult (1805–1876)
The pen name of Ina Lange (1846—1930), Finnish pianist, music historian and author
Daniel Stern (psychologist) (1934–2012), psychoanalytic theorist and author
Daniel Stern (writer) (1928–2007), Jewish American novelist and professor of English

See also
Daniel Stein (disambiguation)